Baghdad Wedding is the first play by Hassan Abdulrazzak. It premiered at the Soho Theatre in London, England in 2007, and was directed by Lisa Goldman.

The play touches on the experience of three Expat Iraqis who return to their country after the overthrow of Saddam Hussein.

A recording of this play was broadcast on BBC Radio 3 on January 20, 2008.

The Company B production ran from February 12, 2009 to March 22, 2009 at the Belvoir St Theatre, Sydney.

References

External links
Soho Theatre's official Baghdad Wedding page
Playtext published by Oberon Modern Plays, 2007

2007 plays
Iraqi fiction
Fiction set in the 2000s
Plays set in London
Baghdad in fiction